Dane Murphy (born March 15, 1986) is a retired American soccer player. 

Murphy played for D.C. United in Major League Soccer before joining German 2. Bundesliga team VfL Osnabrück. In 2012, he joined New York Cosmos in the North American Soccer League. After retirement in 2015, Murphy went into scouting for the Cosmos and then Real Salt Lake before being promoted to technical director. He returned to European football in 2019 as CEO of Barnsley F.C., before taking the same role at Nottingham Forest F.C..

Playing career

High School 
Murphy spent his high school career playing midfield for Choate Rosemary Hall. He received numerous awards during his career including being named First-Team All-State, All-Region and All-Founders League, being selected as a Parade All-American and being placed on Soccer America's "Players to Watch" list.

Murphy was also a member of the United States Under-20 National Pool and the United States Under-18 National Team. He played on the Founders League and New England championship squads and was a member of the Regional Team from 1999–2004.

Collegiate 
Murphy selected the University of Virginia after looks from other top universities such as Wake Forest University, University of North Carolina and University of Notre Dame.

He made his collegiate debut on September 3, 2004 against Marshall University in the Virginia Soccer Classic. He played six more games during the 2004 season.

During the 2005 season, Murphy started 13 of the 14 games he appeared in, and scored two goals and had one assist during the 958 minutes he played. Both of his goals came in a victory over University of South Florida in the second round of the NCAA Tournament.

Professional 
In 2008, Murphy signed with D.C. United of MLS where he was a member of their 2008 U.S. Open Cup winning team. He also started 12 matches for United's Reserves squad.

In 2009, he was signed to VFL Osnabrück in Germany's 2. Bundesliga, after a two-week trial. Over the next year and a half he played most of his competitive matches with VFL II.

In 2011, he was selected as the captain of the Cosmos PDL squad that participated in the 2011–12 exhibition matches with PDL teams throughout the Northeast United States.

Murphy was one of the longest tenured players on the Cosmos roster. He started and played in 88 minutes in the Paul Scholes Testimonial Match in August 2011 against Manchester United at Old Trafford.

On February 13, 2013, Murphy signed with the new New York Cosmos of the NASLand made his debut on October 6, 2013 as a stoppage time substitute in the Cosmos victory over Minnesota United FC. He appeared in 4 more games in the inaugural season that culminated in the team winning Soccer Bowl 2013 with a 1–0 victory over the Atlanta Silverbacks on November 9, 2013.

In the 2014 season, Murphy made seven appearances and four starts for the Cosmos as the team clinched a spot in The Championship – the NASL's four team postseason tournament.

Scouting and Management 
January 2015, Murphy retired as a professional to become the New York Cosmos Head Scout. Since his on field retirement and subsequent move into the New York Cosmos front office he served as a scout and then Technical Director for Real Salt Lake of the MLS.

On 27 January 2019, Murphy was hired as the Technical Director of D.C. United and Loudoun United FC. In this position, Murphy would work closely with coaching and technical staff to identify talented players domestically and globally in an aim to supplement the D.C. United first team roster and help develop the Black-and-Red's new USL affiliate.

In July 2019 Murphy was hired by Barnsley F.C. to replace Gauthier Ganaye who was returning to France as president of OGC Nice.

On July 19, 2021, Murphy was confirmed as the new CEO for Nottingham Forest. On 9 January 2023, Murphy and Forest mutually agreed to part ways.

References

External links
 Virginia bio

1986 births
Living people
American soccer players
Virginia Cavaliers men's soccer players
VfL Osnabrück players
D.C. United players
New York Cosmos (2010) players
Association football midfielders
Soccer players from Connecticut
North American Soccer League players
Sportspeople from Danbury, Connecticut
Nottingham Forest F.C. non-playing staff
American expatriate soccer players
American expatriate soccer players in Germany